Rogério Sampaio Cardoso (born September 12, 1967 in Santos) is a Brazilian judoka and Olympic champion. He won a gold medal at the 1992 Summer Olympics in Barcelona. He dedicated his medal to his  brother Ricardo, who fought in the 1988 Summer Olympics and committed suicide in 1991 after a love disappointment.

Sampaio started at judo when he was four, since his mom thought he was restless and needed more discipline. After the Olympics, he won a bronze medal at the 1993 World Judo Championships. But then injuries hurt his career, making him miss both the 1995 Pan American Games and the 1996 Summer Olympics, in which he went only to coach Danielle Zangrando and as a TV commentator. He retired from international competition in 1998.

After retirement, Sampaio runs a dojo in Santos, from which Olympic medalist Leandro Guilheiro originated, and acts as TV commentator. He also coached the Brazilian women's judo team at the 2001 Universiade (fellow Olympic champion Aurélio Miguel coached the masculine).

Rogerio Sampaio is the actual General Secretary of the National Antidoping Agency of Brazil.

References

External links
 Official website
 sports-reference

1967 births
Living people
Sportspeople from Santos, São Paulo
Olympic judoka of Brazil
Judoka at the 1992 Summer Olympics
Olympic gold medalists for Brazil
Olympic medalists in judo
Brazilian male judoka
Medalists at the 1992 Summer Olympics
20th-century Brazilian people
21st-century Brazilian people